Frances Evelyn Bay (née Goffman; January 23, 1919 – September 15, 2011) was a Canadian-American character actress and comedian. In a career that spanned 35 years, she acted in a variety of roles both in film and television. Bay was inducted in Canada's Walk of Fame in 2008.

Early life
Frances Evelyn Goffman was born January 23, 1919, in Mannville, Alberta, to Ukrainian Jewish immigrant parents, Ann (née Averbach) and Max Goffman, and was raised in Dauphin, Manitoba. Her younger brother was the noted sociologist Erving Goffman. Before World War II she acted professionally in Winnipeg and spent the war hosting the Canadian Broadcasting Company's radio show, Everybody's Program, aimed at service members overseas.

She married Charles Irwin Bay (December 15, 1918 – June 18, 2002) in 1946, and moved to Cape Town, South Africa, living in the Constantia and Camps Bay areas. She studied with Uta Hagen at this time. Charles and Frances Bay had one son, Josh (Eli Joshua; March 14, 1947 – June 6, 1970), who died at the age of 23.

Career
Bay started her career in the 1930s as a radio actress.

Bay returned to acting in the 1970s, appearing in television and film roles until 1976 while in her mid-50s, beginning with a small part in Foul Play, a 1978 comedy starring Goldie Hawn and Chevy Chase. A year earlier, she appeared as Mrs. Hamilton in the Christmas television special Christmastime with Mister Rogers.  In 1990, she appeared in the episode "When I'm 64" of the TV series ALF as the faded movie star Louise Beaumont residing in a retirement home.

Bay's first major television appearance occurred playing the grandmother to the character of Fonzie on Happy Days. She described Henry Winkler, who played Fonzie, as "just a sweet guy. He lost his own grandmother in the Holocaust, and he wrote me a letter saying I was his virtual grandmother".

In 1983, she played the grandmother in Little Red Riding Hood in Faerie Tale Theatre for Showtime. She appeared in the final episodes of two long-running sitcom series: Happy Days, and Who's the Boss? Bay played Cousin Winifred in the fourth to last episode of Road to Avonlea, a role for which she won a Gemini Award. Bay's feature film work includes small roles in films like The Karate Kid (1984), Movers & Shakers (1985), Big Top Pee-wee (1988), Twins (1988), The Grifters (1990), The Pit and the Pendulum (1991).

In 1986, Bay appeared as the doddery aunt of Kyle MacLachlan's character in David Lynch's Blue Velvet. Lynch cast her in several subsequent works, including as a foul-mouthed madam in Wild at Heart, and as Mrs. Tremond on Twin Peaks and its feature film prequel Twin Peaks: Fire Walk with Me.

In 1994, she played Mrs. Pickman in John Carpenter's In the Mouth of Madness. In 1996, she played Adam Sandler's grandmother in the feature film Happy Gilmore. In 1999, she played Thelma, the head security guard at the Bradford robotics laboratory in the film Inspector Gadget. Bay's other roles included a supporting role in "The Rye", a notable 1996 episode of Seinfeld in which she played a woman who got into a physical altercation with Jerry over a loaf of marble rye bread.

Bay appeared in the 2002 music video for Jimmy Fallon's comedy song "Idiot Boyfriend". In 2005, she reunited with her The Pit and the Pendulum director Stuart Gordon to play a fortune teller in Edmond. From 2009 to 2011, Bay had a recurring role as "Aunt Ginny" on the television series The Middle. Her  character was subsequently written out of the show after her death in September 2011, and the death was addressed in the episode "The Map". She also worked in theatre, winning both the Drama-Logue Award and Gemini Award.

Bay was inducted into Canada's Walk of Fame on September 6, 2008, in large part thanks to a petition with 10,000 names which was submitted on her behalf. The selection committee also received personal letters from Adam Sandler, Jerry Seinfeld, David Lynch, Henry Winkler, Monty Hall, and other celebrities.

Personal life and death
In 2002, Bay was involved in an auto accident in Glendale, California, which required her to have her leg amputated below the knee.

Bay died in Tarzana, California, on September 15, 2011, of complications from pneumonia at the age of 92.

Filmography

Film

Television

References

External links

1919 births
2011 deaths
American amputees
American people of Ukrainian-Jewish descent
American film actresses
American television actresses
Actresses from Manitoba
Burials at Mount Sinai Memorial Park Cemetery
Canadian people of Ukrainian-Jewish descent
Canadian amputees
Canadian emigrants to the United States
Canadian film actresses
Canadian television actresses
Canadian Screen Award winners
Deaths from pneumonia in California
Jewish American actresses
Jewish Canadian actresses
People from Dauphin, Manitoba
People from the County of Minburn No. 27
People with acquired American citizenship
21st-century American Jews
21st-century American women